Geoffrey Streatfeild (born 1975) is an English actor in film, television, stage and radio.

Career 
His notable film and TV roles include The Other Boleyn Girl and Kinky Boots. He also appeared in the Royal Shakespeare Company's "Histories" company in 2007-08 as Prince Hal/Henry V (Henry IV Part One, Henry IV Part Two and Henry V), Suffolk (Henry VI Parts I and II), Rivers (Henry VI Part III and Richard III).

His elder brother Richard Streatfeild, as a serving Major in the Rifles, advised Geoffrey on military life for his roles in Henry V and Journey's End. Streatfeild joined the cast of Spooks for its final series in 2011, playing the character of Calum Reed, a Junior Case Officer at MI5 until its end. In 2012 Streatfeild joined the cast of the BBC2 political satire The Thick of It as the "Inbetweener" junior minister in DoSac. In 2015 he reprised his role as Calum Reed in the spy film Spooks: The Greater Good.

Personal life
Streatfeild was married to actor Nikki Amuka-Bird from 2003 to 2010.

Selected credits

Stage 
Eigengrau (Bush Theatre) by Penelope Skinner
The History Boys (National, tour) by Alan Bennett
Bacchai (National Theatre)
Mountain Language (Royal Court)
Journey’s End, as Stanhope (Comedy Theatre) by R. C. Sherriff
Nathan the Wise (Chichester)
Merchant of Venice (Chichester) by William Shakespeare
Macbeth (Sheffield Crucible) by William Shakespeare
My Night with Reg (Donmar Warehouse and Apollo Theatre) by Kevin Elyot
The Beaux' Stratagem (National Theatre) by George Farquhar
Young Chekhov Ivanov (National Theatre) by Anton Chekhov
Young Chekhov The Seagull (National Theatre) by Anton Chekhov
Cell Mates (Hampstead Theatre) by Simon Gray in December 2017

TV 
Sword of Honour (2001)
Love in a Cold Climate (2001)
The Other Boleyn Girl (2003)
Elizabeth I (2005)
Twenty Thousand Streets Under the Sky (2005)
Midsomer Murders (2005)
Ashes to Ashes (2009) – As 'New Arrival'
Spooks (2011)
The Thick of It (2012)
Endeavour (2013) As Dr. Daniel Cronyn (in Series 1, Episode 2 'Fugue')
The Hollow Crown (2016) – as Edward IV, (in 2 episodes: Henry VI part II and Richard III)
Life (2020)

Film 
Match Point
Kinky Boots
City Slacker
Spooks: The Greater Good (2015)
Consent (2023)

Radio 
The Officers' Ward
David Copperfield, BBC Radio 4 Woman's Hour Drama, 5–30 December 2005
Brideshead Revisited
The Waterbucks, BBC Radio 4 Afternoon Play, 23 November 2005
Marks
Richard III
Much Ado About Nothing
Nathan The Wise
The History Boys
The Pallisers
The Ballad of Shane O’Neill
Shylock
Success Story, BBC Radio 4 Afternoon Play, 6 March 2009
Modesty Blaise – A Taste for Death, BBC Radio 4 15 Minute Drama, 17–21 December 2012

References

External links 

Geoffrey
Living people
1975 births
Alumni of RADA
English male film actors
English male stage actors
English male radio actors
English male television actors